The 2007 Rutgers Scarlet Knights football team represented Rutgers University in the 2007 NCAA Division I FBS football season. The team was led by seventh-year head coach Greg Schiano.

For the first time in the history of Rutgers football, the team entered a season ranked—they were 16th in both the Associated Press and Coaches polls.  The Scarlet Knights finished the season with an 8–5 record that included a 52–30 victory over the Ball State Cardinals in the 2008 International Bowl.  It marked the third consecutive appearance of the team in a post-season bowl game, and the second bowl game won by the team.

Schedule

References

Rutgers
Rutgers Scarlet Knights football seasons
International Bowl champion seasons
Rutgers Scarlet Knights football